Wild Horse Casino is the name of several casinos including:

Wild Horse Casino (Jicarilla Apache Nation) in Dulce, New Mexico
Wild Horse Casino (Cripple Creek) in Colorado